The Baffin Mountains are a mountain range running along the northeastern coast of Baffin Island and Bylot Island, Nunavut, Canada. While they are separated by bodies of water to make Baffin Island, they are closely related to the other mountain ranges that make the much larger Arctic Cordillera mountain range.

Terrain
There are no trees in the Baffin Mountains because they are north of the Arctic tree line. Rocks that compose the Baffin Mountains are primarily deeply dissected granitic rocks. They were covered with ice until about 1500 years ago, and vast parts of them are still ice-covered. Geologically, the Baffin Mountains form the eastern edge of the Canadian Shield, which covers much of Canada's landscape.

Glaciation
The ranges of the Baffin Mountains are separated by deep fjords and glaciated valleys with many spectacular glacial and ice-capped mountains. The snowfall in the Baffin Mountains is light, much less than in places like the Saint Elias Mountains in southeastern Alaska and southwestern Yukon which are plastered with snow.

During the mid-1990s, Canadian researchers studied the glacier's patterns of freezing and thawing over centuries by drilling ice core samples.

Flora and fauna
The dominant vegetation in the Baffin Mountains is a discontinuous cover of mosses, lichens and cold-hardy vascular plants such as sedge and cottongrass.

History
One of the first mountaineering expeditions in the Baffin Mountains was in 1934 by J.M Wordie, in which two peaks called Pioneer Peak and Longstaff Tower were climbed.

The Auyuittuq National Park was established in 1976. It features much Arctic wilderness, such as fjords, glaciers and ice fields. In Inuktitut – the language of Nunavut's Aboriginal people, Inuit – Auyuittuq means "the land that never melts". Although Auyuittuq was established in 1976 as a national park reserve, it was upgraded to a full national park in 2000.

There were Inuit settlements in the Baffin Mountains before European contact. The first European contact is believed to have been by Norse explorers in the 11th century, but the first recorded sighting of Baffin Island was made by Martin Frobisher during his search for the Northwest Passage in 1576.

References

Arctic Cordillera
Mountain ranges of Baffin Island
Protected areas of Nunavut